The following is a table of managers and coaches that have been in charge of Tottenham Hotspur in date ascending order from past to present.

Managers
Listed according to when they became managers for Tottenham Hotspur:
(C) – caretaker
(I) – interim

Managers with the highest win percentage

''Based on win percentage in all competitions

* Stats correct as of 9 March 2023

Honours

References

External links
List of Tottenham Hotspur F.C. managers at Topspurs.com

Managers
Tottenham Hotspur F.C. managers
Tottenham Hotspur